Lindsay Davenport and Natasha Zvereva were the defending champions but they competed with different partners that year, Davenport with Chanda Rubin and Zvereva with Gigi Fernández.

Fernández and Zvereva lost in the first round to Anna Kournikova and Ai Sugiyama, as did Davenport and Rubin to Katrina Adams and Patricia Tarabini.

Yayuk Basuki and Caroline Vis won in the final 7–6, 6–3 against Larisa Savchenko and Helena Suková.

Seeds
Champion seeds are indicated in bold text while text in italics indicates the round in which those seeds were eliminated.

 Gigi Fernández /  Natasha Zvereva (first round)
 Martina Hingis /  Arantxa Sánchez Vicario (first round)
 Nicole Arendt /  Manon Bollegraf (first round)
 Larisa Savchenko /  Helena Suková (final)

Draw

External links
 1997 Acura Classic Doubles Draw

LA Women's Tennis Championships
1997 WTA Tour